The 1992–93 Southern Football League season was the 90th in the history of the league, an English football competition.

Dover Athletic won the Premier Division to earned promotion to the Football Conference. VS Rugby and Weymouth were relegated to the Midland and Southern Division respectively, whilst Dartford withdrew from the league after four matches due to financial problems and joined the Kent League the following season. Nuneaton Borough, Sittingbourne and Gresley Rovers (in their first season in the Southern League) were promoted to the Premier Division, the former two as champions. Despite finishing second in the Southern Division, Salisbury were denied promotion due to ground grading, saving Premier Division club Moor Green from relegation. Barry Town left the Southern League to join the League of Wales, whilst Andover dropped into the Wessex League.

Premier Division
The Premier Division consisted of 22 clubs, including 17 clubs from the previous season and five new clubs:
Two clubs promoted from the Midland Division:
Hednesford Town
Solihull Borough

Two clubs promoted from the Southern Division:
Hastings Town
Weymouth

Plus:
Cheltenham Town, relegated from the Football Conference

League table

Midland Division
The Midland Division consisted of 22 clubs, including 19 clubs from the previous season and three new clubs:
Evesham United, promoted from the Midland Combination
Gresley Rovers, promoted from the West Midlands (Regional) League
Weston-super-Mare, promoted from the Western League

At the end of the previous season Stroud reverted name to Forest Green Rovers, while Rushden Town merged with the United Counties League club Irthlingborough Diamonds to create new club Rushden & Diamonds, who took over place in the Midland Division.

League table

Southern Division
The Southern Division consisted of 22 clubs, including 18 clubs from the previous season and four clubs, relegated from the Premier Division:
Fisher Athletic
Gravesend & Northfleet
Poole Town
Wealdstone

At the end of the season Salisbury changed name to Salisbury City, and Fisher Athletic changed name to Fisher.

League table

See also
Southern Football League
1992–93 Isthmian League
1992–93 Northern Premier League

References

Southern Football League seasons
6